José Luis Mentxaka Fernández (born 21 April 1942) is a Spanish former professional footballer who played as a forward.

Early and personal life
Mentxaka was born in Deusto; his father Nicolás and brother (also called Nicolás) were also footballers.

Career
Mentxaka played for Indautxu, Burgos and Real Oviedo.

References

1942 births
Living people
Spanish footballers
Association football forwards
SD Indautxu footballers
Burgos CF footballers
Real Oviedo players
Segunda División players
Footballers from Bilbao